"Re-Arranged" is a song by American rap rock band Limp Bizkit from their second studio album, Significant Other. It was released as the band's second single from the album and was the band's only number one single on the Billboard Modern Rock chart.

Music video

The music video opens with a clip of Oregon State Correctional Institution. The video portrays the band in prison cells at the beginning, where they are soon taken and put on trial for Woodstock 1999. They are found guilty, and the video shows them performing the last portion of the song from inside a metal container, as onlookers watch while milk pours into the container to drown the band. When the song ends, the milk drains from the container, and the band is nowhere to be seen.

Only Durst's baseball cap, and a copy of the album Significant Other lies at the bottom of the container. This, according to Durst, was to show that while critics will assault the band until they are gone, their music will continue to live on forever, regardless. After they are drowned, they are seen floating in heaven. Wes Borland asks, "Are we in heaven? I think we're dead!" Durst replies, "Dude, if we were in heaven, man, I'd be kickin' it with Method Man right now," then drops out of sight. The video for "N 2 Gether Now," the third single from the album, begins immediately afterwards, with Durst falling into Method Man's apartment and landing next to him on the couch.

Matt Pinfield appears in the video as the judge, as well as Durst's mother Anita.

Track listing
 "Re-Arranged" (dirty version)
 "Faith"
 "Counterfeit" (Lethal Dose remix)
 "Faith" (music video)

Charts

External links

References

1999 songs
1999 singles
Flip Records (1994) singles
American alternative rock songs
Limp Bizkit songs
Music videos directed by Fred Durst
Songs written by Fred Durst
Songs written by Wes Borland
Songs written by John Otto (drummer)
Songs written by Sam Rivers (bassist)